Meziboří is a town in Most District in the Ústí nad Labem Region of the Czech Republic. It has about 4,700 inhabitants.

Geography
The entire municipal territory lies in the Ore Mountains.

History

The first written mention of Meziboří is from 1398 (under its German name Schönbach). For centuries, the inhabitants have subsisted on agriculture, especially the cultivation of rye, oats, potatoes, cattle grazing and forestry. It remained so even at the beginning of industrialization in the second half of the 19th century. The number of inhabitants in the surrounding villages, which depended on coal mining, increased, but in Schönbach the population did not change. Fields on mountain slopes surrounded by forests on all sides couldn't feed more people.

The development of Schönbach was determined by an organized recruitment program for apprentices for heavy industries, announced in 1949 by President Klement Gottwald. In September 1950, the first dormitory for 360 mining apprentices was opened, and in January 1951, a dormitory was opened for another 360 apprentices at the chemical school. In 1952, a girls' apprentice dormitory for miners and excavators was opened. At that time, the town's population reached two thousand. Between 1953 and 1968, a housing estate with fifteen hundred flats was being built. Most of the houses of the old village was demolished and only 11 are preserved to this day. In 1957, the town was renamed Meziboří.

Demographics

Sport
There is a ski resort in Meziboří, operated by the town.

Twin towns – sister cities

Meziboří is twinned with:
 Sayda, Germany
 Sogliano al Rubicone, Italy

References

External links

Cities and towns in the Czech Republic
Socialist planned cities
Populated places in Most District